G. C. Smith may be:
 Green Clay Smith, (1826-1895), American Civil War officer and politician
 Gilbert C. Smith, fl. 1870-1895, Mississippi politician
 George C. Smith (Mississippi politician), fl. 1870s